Terminator 3: The Redemption is an action-adventure video game based on the 2003 film Terminator 3: Rise of the Machines. It was developed by Paradigm Entertainment and published by Atari in 2004 for the PlayStation 2, Xbox, and GameCube. Terminator 3: The Redemption received "mixed or average" reviews according to Metacritic. It was praised for its graphics and was considered an improvement over an earlier game (Terminator 3: Rise of the Machines); however, the gameplay was criticized as linear, repetitive and difficult.

Gameplay 
Terminator 3: The Redemption features several gameplay styles presented from a third-person perspective across 14 levels, which are partially based on the film Terminator 3: Rise of the Machines, while expanding the film's backstory. The player takes the role of a T-850 Terminator. Several levels are played on foot as the player fights against other Terminators. The player can use various guns against enemies, and can also engage them in hand-to-hand combat. The player can also use detached road signs as weapons. In addition, the player can utilize the T-850's red-colored scan mode, during which it can deal increased damage to enemies. Points, known as "Terabytes", are spread throughout the game and can be collected to upgrade the scan mode.

In addition, the game features driving levels which include a variety of different vehicles, including a hearse, a pickup truck, and a police car. Also featured are rail shooter levels in which the player is in a travelling vehicle and must shoot oncoming Terminator enemies. As in the film, the T-X is the primary enemy encountered throughout the game. A two-player co-op mode is included as a rail shooter game in which the players must defend against oncoming Terminators.

Plot 
The story starts in the year 2032 with a squad of Tech-Com soldiers storming a Skynet facility in order to stop a T-X from entering a time displacement machine. However, they are no match for the T-X's superior capabilities and all are gruesomely killed.

Meanwhile, Katherine Brewster and the Human Resistance ambush the T-850 that was responsible for the death of John Connor. A Tech-Com technician reprograms the cyborg to be sent back to July 23, 2003 to protect Kate and John's earlier selves. The T-850, with the assistance of several Tech-Com soldiers manages to fight its way to the main gate of the Skynet bunker and it enters the time displacement machine.

In the past, the T-850 rescues John and Kate from the T-X, and informs them that Judgment Day is to begin within the next few hours. It plans to acquire a plane from a nearby military base, and fly the pair to Crystal Peak, a bunker that will ensure their survival during the nuclear blasts. As they arrive at the base, the T-X reappears, and hits the T-850 into a prototype time machine; it is sent back into the future, arriving in a new, alternate future where Skynet has triumphed.

The Terminator once again fights its way through Skynet and sends itself back to 2003. It appears just in time to fight off the T-X while John and Kate escape to Crystal Peak. At the bunker, the T-850 prevents the T-X from reaching John and Kate by blocking its route to them. The T-850 places its damaged fuel cell into the T-X's mouth, resulting in a large explosion that seemingly destroys both Terminators.

Following Judgment Day, John removes the CPU from the heavily damaged T-850's metal skull, deactivating it. The story then shifts further into the war, where John is leading the Resistance. He uses the CPU to reactivate the Terminator, who is revealed to have been rebuilt as an extensively modified FK Reaper. The Terminator then stomps out into battle, aiding John Connor once again, as the game closes with the final caption: "The battle has just begun...".

Development and release 
Terminator 3: The Redemption was developed by Paradigm Entertainment and published by Atari. The game was developed simultaneously with the video game Terminator 3: Rise of the Machines, which was developed by Black Ops. Both development teams took pictures of the film set to aid in development of the games. Black Ops' game was released alongside the DVD release of the film in November 2003, while Paradigm was unable to make the date due to the bigger design of their own game. Atari agreed to give Paradigm more time to work on Terminator 3: The Redemption. Paradigm had previously developed The Terminator: Dawn of Fate (2002), and the same concept team returned to work on The Redemption.

Despite the poor reception of Black Ops' Terminator 3 game, Atari chose to proceed with The Redemption. Atari acquired the rights to use the likeness of Arnold Schwarzenegger and Kristanna Loken, who portray the Terminators in the film. Scans of the actors were taken in 3D to create their in-game counterparts. Paradigm also worked with C2 Pictures on the game's enemy designs and story elements.

Lead game designer Shawn Wright said that working on a film license provided many advantages such as an existing universe and characters, but also said that a disadvantage is that content needed to be sent out to California to be approved. The game includes footage from the film. Aspects of the game were influenced by Grand Theft Auto III though the development team were careful not to create a GTA clone. Paradigm stated that 50 percent of the gameplay is vehicle-based, 25 percent with rail-shooter action and the final 25 percent is character combat. The fast pace of the game was a conscious decision by the developers of the game. Producer Josh Hackney said, "We didn't want to take the gameplay and player control away from the player for more than five seconds." A feature developed for the game, but removed in the final version was the use of mission timers. The timer required the player to finish certain levels within a set time. Otherwise, they will not progress to the next level. The final game uses timers but they are unnecessary to finish the level. Instead, the player can progress at their own pace. If the mission is completed within the time limit then the player will be rewarded. The targeting system was also changed during development. Schwarzenegger provided some voice acting for the game and the rest was voiced by a soundalike, Mark Mosley.

Development was concluded as of August 2004, and the game was shipped to North American retailers on September 9, 2004, less than 10 months after the previous Terminator 3 game. In Japan, the game was released for PlayStation 2 and GameCube on January 20, 2005.

Reception 

Terminator 3: The Redemption received "mixed or average" reviews on all platforms according to the review aggregation website Metacritic. The game was seen as an improvement over the original Terminator 3 game, and some critics considered the "Redemption" title an appropriate one, with Alex Navarro of GameSpot writing "the name The Redemption seems all too apt when describing this latest Terminator title, because it turns out that this one is actually pretty good."

Jeremy Dunham of IGN considered it the first good game in the series since The Terminator: Future Shock. Louis Bedigian of GameZone favorably compared the game's action to that of the Terminator 2: Judgment Day arcade game. Other reviewers for GameZone concluded that it was the best Terminator game yet. However, critics generally recommended the game as a rental rather than a purchase. GamePro wrote that "although Redemption has its moments, it merits a cautionary rental. Redemption gives some luster back to the Terminator name, but not much." Russ Fischer of GameSpy wrote, "Atari and Paradigm have put together a title that nails the tone of the source, without entirely capturing the appeal."

Praise went to the graphics, including the character models. Game Informer called Schwarzenegger's character "eerily perfect" in appearance. Bennett Ring of The Sydney Morning Herald stated that "The levels are so big and detailed that it's a wonder they don't bring your console to a crashing halt." Some critics believed that the graphics looked best on the Xbox version. The film footage featured in the game received some criticism for its low quality.

The gameplay was criticized as linear and repetitive. Some critics also believed the game lacked replay value. However, praise went to the variety of gameplay styles, which Dunham found to be "surprisingly addictive." Reviewers also criticized the gameplay for its trial-and-error element. The difficulty was criticized as well, including the lack of save points, forcing the player to start a level from the beginning if they lose. Eduardo Zacarias of GameZone wrote, "If there's a game that could have used a checkpoint, this is it." However, Dunham enjoyed the difficulty. Navarro stated that despite the difficulty, the missions "are usually good enough that you will want to keep coming back to try again." Some reviewers were critical of the game's targeting system, although Fischer considered it easy to use.

Critics praised the driving and rail shooter levels, which were generally considered to be the best parts of the game. Mike Reilly of Game Revolution wrote that the on-foot levels "are a bit drab in comparison." GameZone's Natalie Romano wrote "it's the driving parts that keep this from being just a simple shooter". GamePro opined that the film-based levels were not as fun as those created specifically for the game.

The music and sound was praised, although GamePro considered the music to be monotonous. The voiceovers were also generally praised, although Andrew Reiner of Game Informer was critical of Schwarzenegger's "horrifying one-liners", and Navarro was critical of Schwarzenegger's substitute voice actor: "To say that this substitute actor is merely subpar would be something of an understatement. Fortunately, this is really the only blemish on the game's audio." GamePro stated that Schwarzenegger's "one-liners couldn't sound more uninspired", although Romano enjoyed them.

References

External links 

 

2004 video games
Sony Pictures video games
Atari games
Terminator (franchise) video games
GameCube games
PlayStation 2 games
Video games scored by Cris Velasco
Video games set in 2003
Video games set in 2032
Video games set in California
Video games set in Los Angeles
Video games developed in the United States
Xbox games
Action-adventure games
Paradigm Entertainment games
Multiplayer and single-player video games
Cooperative video games